Zébulon is a Canadian music group based in Montreal, Quebec. They released three albums and several singles between 1994 and 2008.

History
Zébulon was formed in 1993 in Montreal by singer-bassist Marc Déry, guitarist Yves Déry, keyboardist Yves Marchand and drummer Alain Quirion. Marc and Yves are brothers. 

The band released its first self-titled album in 1994. Their song "Job Steady" received radio play, and they also release singles "Les femmes préfèrent les Ginos" and "Adrénaline". In 1997, they won group of the year honours at Quebec's Felix Awards.

After 1997, the band became inactive, but the original members got back together to record an album, Retour sur Mars, in 2008.  They then toured in support of the album.

Band members
 Marc Déry (vocals, bass, guitar)
 Yves Déry (vocals, guitar)
 Yves Marchand (vocals, piano, organ, synthesiser)
 Alain Quirion (vocals, drums/percussion)

Discography
 1994: Zébulon
 1996: L'Oeil du Zig
 2008: Retour sur Mars

References

External links 
  Zébulon Official band site
  Québec Info Musique: Zébulon

Musical groups established in 1993
Musical groups from Montreal
Canadian folk rock groups
Audiogram (label) artists
1993 establishments in Quebec